Jacky Connon was a professional football player who played in the centre- forward position for Aberdeen.

History

Connon started his career playing for the Aberdeenshire junior clubs of Carlton and then Richmond.

He joined Aberdeen just after the First World War.

He played either inside-right or centre-forward.

He played for Aberdeen till about 1924 then had two seasons with Forfar Athletic.

Outside of football

During the First World War he served with the Royal Artillery.

He became an agency superintendent of the Royal Insurance Company.

His son was Bill Connon, a rugby union player who became President of the Scottish Rugby Union.

References

Association football forwards
Aberdeen F.C. players
Scottish Football League players
Year of birth missing
Scottish footballers
1953 deaths